Hsueh Hsuan-yi (born 26 October 1985) is a Taiwanese badminton player. In 2014 he participated at the Asian Games. In 2009, he became the runner-up at the U.S. Open tournament, defeated by Taufik Hidayat of Indonesia in the final round. In 2011, he won the Dutch Open tournament after beating his compatriot Chou Tien-chen. In 2013, he became the runner-up at the Macau Open tournament.

Achievements

BWF World Senior Championships 
Men's singles

East Asian Games 
Men's singles

Summer Universiade 
Men's singles

BWF Grand Prix 
The BWF Grand Prix has two levels, Grand Prix and Grand Prix Gold. It is a series of badminton tournaments, sanctioned by the Badminton World Federation (BWF) since 2007.

Men's singles

 BWF Grand Prix Gold tournament
 BWF Grand Prix tournament

BWF International Challenge/Series 
Men's singles

 BWF International Challenge tournament
 BWF International Series tournament

References

External links
 
 Victorracquets.com

Taiwanese male badminton players
1985 births
Living people
Badminton players at the 2010 Asian Games
Badminton players at the 2014 Asian Games
Asian Games bronze medalists for Chinese Taipei
Asian Games medalists in badminton
Universiade medalists in badminton
Medalists at the 2014 Asian Games
Universiade bronze medalists for Chinese Taipei
Medalists at the 2011 Summer Universiade
21st-century Taiwanese people